Hendre-Rhys is a small village in the  community of Trawsgoed, Ceredigion, Wales, which is 67.8 miles (109.2 km) from Cardiff and 173 miles (278.4 km) from London. Hendre-Rhys is represented in the Senedd by Elin Jones (Plaid Cymru) and is part of the Ceredigion constituency in the House of Commons.

References

See also
List of localities in Wales by population

Villages in Ceredigion